During the 2006 Lebanon War, a number of international incidents occurred in Lebanon, largely involving United Nations personnel in Lebanon, who have come under a number of attacks. On 25 July 2006, four unarmed United Nations Truce Supervision Organization (UNTSO) peacekeepers were killed during an Israeli air strike on a UN observation post in southern Lebanon. Israel later stated that the attack was an error due to the incorrect identification of the UN position as a militant enemy post.

UN operations in Lebanon

The United Nations Interim Force in Lebanon, or UNIFIL, was created by the United Nations, by Security Council Resolution 425 and 426 on 19 March 1978. UNIFIL's objective was to confirm Israeli withdrawal from Lebanon, to restore international peace and security, and to help the Lebanese Government restore effective authority in the area. The first UNIFIL troops to arrive in the area on 23 March 1978 were reassigned from other UN peacekeeping operations in the area (namely UNEF and UNDOF).

During the 1982 Lebanon War, U.N. positions were overrun, primarily by the South Lebanon Army forces under Major Saad Haddad. These were the indigenous Lebanese forces supported by the IDF. During the occupation, UNIFIL's function was mainly to provide humanitarian aid. In 1999, Israel undertook a full withdrawal, which concluded in 2000 and enabled UNIFIL to resume its military tasks. The UN Security Council has extended UNIFIL's mandate until August 31, 2006.

UNIFIL's function was mainly the provision of food and aid to locals in Southern Lebanon. In 1999, Israel undertook a full withdrawal, which concluded in 2000 and enabled UNIFIL to resume its military tasks. At Lebanon's request, in January 2006 the UN extended UNIFIL's mandate to expire on 31 July 2006.

25 July attack on UN observation post

Attack
On 25 July 2006 four unarmed United Nations Truce Supervision Organization (UNTSO) peacekeepers from Austria, China, Finland and Canada were killed in an Israeli air strike at a UN observation post in southern Lebanon. According to the UN, the four had taken shelter in a bunker under the post, which was a three story building inside a patrol base in Khiyam. The area had been struck by artillery and aerial bombardment over a period of 6 hours. According to the IDF, Hezbollah artillery had been firing at Israeli positions from the area. According to a UN official who had seen the preliminary report, the post called an Israeli liaison officer ten times to call off the bombardment and an Israeli official promised to halt the bombing each time.

A UNIFIL rescue team of Indian soldiers was immediately dispatched to the scene. They recovered the bodies of three observers from the rubble while there was still active hostilities. Danny Ayalon, Israel's ambassador to the United States, said that "UNIFIL obviously got caught in the middle" of a gunfight between Hezbollah guerillas and Israeli troops."We do not have yet confirmation what caused these deaths. It could be (Israel Defense Forces). It could be Hezbollah," he said.

Victims
By 8 August 2006, the bodies of observers were retrieved and identified. The four victims of the attack, from UNTSO Team Sierra, were:
 Sierra Team Leader: Major Hans-Peter Lang, 44, from Güssing, Austria. He was survived by an 11-year-old son and his 70-year-old mother.
 Sierra Deputy Team Leader: Lieutenant Senior Grade Jarno Mäkinen, 29, from Kaarina, Finland. Lt Mäkinen was a former unit commander in the Uusimaa Brigade. He was transferred to the UNTSO in November 2005.
 Major (Posthumously promoted Lieutenant Colonel) Du Zhaoyu (杜照宇), 34, from Jinan, China. He had served as secretary to the military attache in the Chinese Embassy in India. He left his wife and a one-year-old son.
Major Paeta Derek Hess-von Kruedener, from Kingston, Canada. A member of the Princess Patricia's Canadian Light Infantry, he had previously served in Cyprus, Bosnia and Congo before serving in UNTSO from October 2005.

Responses
Secretary-General Kofi Annan initially stated that he was "…shocked and deeply distressed by the apparently deliberate targeting by Israeli Defence Forces." "This coordinated artillery and aerial attack on a long-established and clearly marked U.N. post at Khiyam occurred despite personal assurances given to me by Prime Minister Ehud Olmert that U.N. positions would be spared Israeli fire," he said in a statement. "Furthermore, General Alain Pellegrini, the U.N. force commander in south Lebanon, had been in repeated contact with Israeli officers throughout the day, stressing the need to protect that particular U.N. position from attack."

Ayalon, Israeli ambassador to the United States called Annan's statement "outrageous," while Israel's U.N. ambassador, Dan Gillerman, said he, too, was "deeply distressed" that Annan alleged that the strike was deliberate. "I am surprised at these premature and erroneous assertions made by the secretary-general, who while demanding an investigation, has already issued its conclusions," Gillerman said in a statement. However, as at the time Annan had only circumstantial evidence for the bombing being deliberate, many pundits described Annan’s statement as indicative of the UN's anti-Israel bias.

UNIFIL maintained that Hezbollah fighters were not allowed into any of its bases. However, they reported more than 20 instances of rockets being fired from less than 500m from their positions, as well as a number of cases of small arms and mortar fire from within 100m. Additionally, UNIFIL reported several instances of their positions and vehicles being hit by Hezbollah mortars, small arms fire, or rockets.

On 26 July 2006, Israeli Prime Minister Ehud Olmert phoned Kofi Annan and expressed his deep regret over the death of the four UN observers. He promised that Israel would thoroughly investigate the incident and would share the findings with Annan, but said that he was taken aback by secretary general’s statement saying that the Israeli attack on the UN post was "apparently deliberate". The Israeli ambassador to the UN, Dan Gillerman, ruled out major U.N. involvement in any potential international force in Lebanon, saying that more professional and better-trained troops were needed for such a volatile situation.

At a press conference the next day, Annan seemed to soften his stance and clarified that "[t]he statement said 'apparently deliberate targeting,'" stressing that the word "apparent is important in this." He added that he spoke to Olmert and accepted his "deep sorrow" for the incident, which he said Olmert "definitely believes" was a mistake that would be investigated.

Canada’s Prime Minister, Stephen Harper, said he does not believe Israel targeted the post, and pointed to the fact that Israel has been "co-operating with us in our evacuation efforts, in our efforts to move Canadian citizens out of Lebanon, and also trying to keep our own troops that are on the ground involved in the evacuation out of harm's way." He also has exclaimed his concern with the UN in that the post "remained manned during what is now, more or less, a war."

However, Ireland's Foreign Minister Dermot Ahern and its Defence Minister Willie O'Dea were angered because Irish peace keeping troops had been on duty in the observation post 24 hours before the strike. They also said that a senior Irish soldier working for the UN forces was in contact with the Israeli Defence Force's UNIFIL liaison office six times to warn them that their bombardment was endangering the lives of UN staff. Both Ministers called in the Israeli Ambassador to Ireland to express their anger and dissatisfaction.

Ireland has filed an official protest with Israel. China has also strongly condemned the action and demanded that Israel apologize for the attack. Austria's foreign minister, Ursula Plassnik, told her Israeli counterpart by telephone that the bombing was unacceptable and urged Israel to stop its attack on the area.

In an interview with Reuters, Israeli Foreign Ministry spokesman Mark Regev said that "Israel sincerely regrets the tragic death of the UN personnel in south Lebanon. We do not target UN personnel and, since the beginning of this conflict, we have made a consistent effort to ensure the safety of all members of (the UN peacekeeping force). This tragic event will be thoroughly investigated."

On 27 July, the United Nations Security Council issued a statement calling on the Israeli government to conduct a comprehensive inquiry into the incident and stressed that "Israel and all concerned parties" must comply with their obligations under international humanitarian law on the protection of UN personnel.

Investigation into the bombing
Israel has launched an investigation into the bombing and has concluded that the incident was an error. The report says flawed military maps meant the post was wrongly targeted.
Israel's foreign ministry spokesman, Mark Regev, told that the report concludes the attack was an error. Israeli aircraft attacked the post in the belief it was a Hezbollah position.

In 2008, the Canadian Forces released a report on the inquiry of the attack. The report blamed the Israeli Defence Forces for the incident. It also stated that both the Israeli military and the UN refused to provide requested documents for the investigation.

July 18 email message
In an email dated 18 July received by CTV and published 24 July, the deceased Canadian peacekeeper Major Paeta Hess-von Kruedener, stated: "What I can tell you is this: we have on a daily basis had numerous occasions where our position has come under direct or indirect fire from both artillery and aerial bombing. The closest artillery has landed within 2 meters of our position and the closest 1000 lb aerial bomb has landed 100 meters from our patrol base. This has not been deliberate targeting, but has rather been due to tactical necessity."

According to retired Canadian Major General Lewis MacKenzie, interviewed on CBC radio on 26 July, Hess-von Kruedener's phrase 'due to tactical necessity' was "veiled speech in the military. What he was telling us was Hezbollah fighters were all over his position and the IDF were targeting them."
However, Major Paeta Hess-von Kruedener's widow Cynthia stated on 29 July that she blamed the IDF for her husband’s death. She said "Why did they bomb the UN site? In my opinion, those are precision-guided missiles [so] then that it is intentional.…And that wasn't the only day they were firing on that base. My information from him [her husband] is that week upon week they had been firing on there, bombing near it." It has not yet been determined if the munitions were guided or not.

Other incidents

The UNIFIL press releases mention dozen of attacks and near misses on its presence during the present conflict.

UN personnel were pelted with stones by an angry Lebanese crowd after recovering bodies from the aftermath of an IAF airstrike on a convoy fleeing Marwaheen close to Tyre.
Shrapnel from tank shells fired by the IDF seriously wounded an Indian soldier on 16 July.
A  UNIFIL international staff member and his wife were killed after the Israeli air force bombed the Hosh district of Tyre, Lebanon, where they lived on, July 17. Their bodies were recovered from the rubble on July 26.
Hezbollah fire wounded an Italian OGL observer on the border on July 23.
An IDF tank shell hit a UNIFIL position south of Rmaich on Monday 24 July, wounding four Ghanaian soldiers.
On July 25, Hezbollah opened fire on a UNIFIL convoy, forcing it to retreat.
On 29 July, two Indian UN soldiers were wounded after their post was damaged during an IAF airstrike in Southern Lebanon.
On 30 July, following an airstrike on a house in Qana where 28 civilians are confirmed killed with 13 missing, thousands of Lebanese protesters who had reportedly gathered spontaneously in the city centre attacked the UN building in Beirut along with UN staff.
On 6 August, a Hezbollah rocket hit the headquarters of the Chinese UNIFIL contingent, injuring three Chinese peacekeepers.

On 6 August, UNIFIL announced that "[s]ince the outbreak of hostilities, four military observers from OGL, one UNIFIL international staff member and his wife were killed, and four Ghanaian soldiers, three Indian soldiers, three Chinese soldiers and one OGL military observer were wounded as a result of firing."
On 12 August, UNIFIL announced that a Ghanaian peacekeeper had been wounded by IDF artillery fire near the southern village of Hariss.

On 14 August, the IDF targeted what it said was a Palestinian faction in the Ein el-Hilweh refugee camp in Saida. Two missiles were fired into a civilian residential area and killed UNRWA staff member Mr. Abdel Saghir.
Meanwhile, the United Nations Security Council failed to agree on a statement responding to the Israeli attack after the United States refused to accept language condemning: "any deliberate attack against U.N. personnel."'

The United Nations Interim Force In Lebanon (UNIFIL) was created by the United Nations, to confirm Israeli withdrawal from Lebanon, restore the international peace and security, and help the Lebanese Government restore its effective authority in the area. During the 2006 Lebanon War (as in past conflicts; see Qana shelling) the peacekeeping force came under attack from both sides, but mainly from Israeli forces. About 50 members of the unarmed UNTSO were evacuated to lightly armed UNIFIL positions for security reasons.

The most significant incident occurred on 25 July 2006, when four unarmed UNTSO peacekeepers from Austria, China, Finland and Canada were killed in an Israeli air strike on a UN observation post in southern Lebanon. According to the UN, the four had taken shelter in a bunker under the post. It had been shelled 14 times by Israeli artillery over a period of 6 hours, during which the post called an Israeli liaison officer ten times to call off the bombardment. Every time he promised to do so. Secretary General Kofi Annan said in a statement from Rome that he was " ... shocked and deeply distressed by the apparently deliberate targeting by Israeli Defense Forces."
The site of the observation post was well known, and both sides in the conflict had the coordinates of the compound. However, as at the time Annan had no evidence for the bombing being deliberate, many pundits described Annan’s statement as indicative of the UN's anti-Israel bias.  In press releases by UNIFIL on 26 July and 27 July it is noted that Hezbollah had been firing from close to 4 UNIFIL positions in Alma ash Shab, Tibnin Brashit and At Tiri. Ireland's Foreign Ministry said a senior Irish soldier working for the UN forces was in contact with the Israelis six times to warn them that their bombardment was endangering the lives of U.N. staff and on several occasions they were reassured that it will.

According to an interview on CBC radio and multiple print sources, retired Canadian Major General Lewis MacKenzie, referring to an email he had received a few days previously from the now deceased Canadian peacekeeper Major Paeta Hess-von Kruedener, stated that "...what he was telling us was Hezbollah fighters were all over his position and the IDF were (sic) targeting them and that's a favorite trick by people who don't have representation in the UN. They use the UN as shields knowing that they can't be punished for it."

Total casualties

Israeli flyovers
In the aftermath of the war, aircraft of the Israeli Air Force began fly over Lebanon. In September 2006, Major General Alain Pellegrini of France, commander of UNIFIL, warned that the flyovers violated the cease-fire, and that force might be used to stop the incursions. In October 2006, a number of incidents between the Israeli Air Force and UN peacekeepers took place:

 On 3 October 2006, an Israeli fighter jet penetrated the  defence perimeter of the French frigate Courbet, triggering a diplomatic incident between Israel and France. Israel apologized after official protests from France.
 On 24 October 2006, six Israeli fighter jets flew over a German vessel patrolling off Israel's coast just south of Lebanon, after a helicopter took off from the vessel without Israeli permission. The German Defense Ministry claimed that the planes fired flares, and one fired two shots into the air. Israeli officials denied the claim of two shots being fired, but claimed they did not know whether flares had been used.
 On 31 October 2006, eight Israeli F-15 fighter jets flew over many areas of Lebanon, including Beirut. The jets also nose-dived over a French peacekeeping position in what was interpreted as attack formation. French troops responded by readying an anti-aircraft missile. According to French Defence Minister Michele Alliot-Marie, the troops were "seconds away" from firing the missile at the jets.

See also 
 Israel and the United Nations
 United Nations Interim Force in Lebanon
 United Nations Truce Supervision Organization
Attacks on humanitarian workers

References

External links
 Map showing UNIFIL deployment and where UN killed by IDF died.
www.lebanon-israel.info An ongoing discussion on the Lebanon-Israel conflict

2006 Lebanon War
History of the United Nations